Little Meadow Creek is a  long 2nd order tributary to the Rocky River in Cabarrus County, North Carolina.

Course
Little Meadow Creek rises in Smiths Lake, about 1.5 miles south of Barrier Mills, North Carolina, and then flows southwest to join the Rocky River about 2.5 miles west of Locust.

Watershed
Little Meadow Creek drains  of area, receives about 47.6 in/year of precipitation, has a wetness index of 441.93, and is about 49% forested.

References

Rivers of North Carolina
Rivers of Cabarrus County, North Carolina